Events from the year 1982 in Canada.

Incumbents

Crown 
 Monarch – Elizabeth II

Federal government 
 Governor General – Edward Schreyer
 Prime Minister – Pierre Trudeau
 Chief Justice – Bora Laskin (Ontario)
 Parliament – 32nd

Provincial governments

Lieutenant governors 
Lieutenant Governor of Alberta – Francis Charles Lynch-Staunton
Lieutenant Governor of British Columbia – Henry Pybus Bell-Irving 
Lieutenant Governor of Manitoba – Pearl McGonigal 
Lieutenant Governor of New Brunswick – George Stanley 
Lieutenant Governor of Newfoundland – William Anthony Paddon 
Lieutenant Governor of Nova Scotia – John Elvin Shaffner 
Lieutenant Governor of Ontario – John Black Aird 
Lieutenant Governor of Prince Edward Island – Joseph Aubin Doiron 
Lieutenant Governor of Quebec – Jean-Pierre Côté
Lieutenant Governor of Saskatchewan – Irwin McIntosh

Premiers 
Premier of Alberta – Peter Lougheed
Premier of British Columbia – Bill Bennett
Premier of Manitoba – Howard Pawley
Premier of New Brunswick – Richard Hatfield
Premier of Newfoundland – Brian Peckford
Premier of Nova Scotia – John Buchanan
Premier of Ontario – Bill Davis
Premier of Prince Edward Island – James Lee
Premier of Quebec – René Lévesque
Premier of Saskatchewan – Allan Blakeney (Until May 8) then Grant Devine

Territorial governments

Commissioners 
 Commissioner of Yukon – Douglas Bell
 Commissioner of Northwest Territories – John Havelock Parker

Premiers 
Premier of the Northwest Territories – George Braden
Premier of Yukon – Chris Pearson

Events

January to June
January 11 – CBC's The National moves to 10 p.m. and The Journal debuts at 10:22 p.m.
January 15 – Striking Quebec transit workers are forced back to work.
February – First reported cases of AIDS in Canada.
February 15 – 84 are killed when the Ocean Ranger oil platform capsizes.
March 4 – Bertha Wilson is appointed Canada's first female Supreme Court justice.
March 8 – The Canada Act is passed by the British House of Commons.
April 14 – 1982 Northwest Territories division plebiscite
April 17 – Elizabeth II signs Canada's newly patriated constitution in Ottawa and the new Constitution and Charter of Rights and Freedoms comes into effect.
April 26 – Saskatchewan election: Grant Devine's PCs win a landslide majority, defeating Allan Blakeney's NDP.
May 5 – Peru requests Canadian intervention in the ongoing Falklands War.
May 8 – Grant Devine becomes Premier of Saskatchewan after defeating Allan Blakeney's NDP.
May 23 – André Besette beatified by the Pope.
Winning numbers are 03, 11, 12, 14, 41, 43, bonus 13.
June 28 – Access to Information Act passed.

July to December
July 15 – Anik 1, Canada's first communications satellite, is retired after ten years' service.
July 26 – Karen Baldwin is crowned Miss Universe in Lima, Peru, becoming the first Canadian to win this award.
August 16 – Communications satellite Anik D launched.
August 23 – Turkish military attaché to Canada, Colonel Atilla Altıkat, is assassinated by Justice Commandos of the Armenian Genocide in Ottawa.
October 5 – Laurie Skreslet becomes the first Canadian to climb Mount Everest.
October 27 – Dominion Day renamed Canada Day.
October 31 – Marguerite Bourgeoys becomes Canada's first female saint.
November 2 – Alberta election: Peter Lougheed's PCs win a fourth consecutive majority.
December 10 – Canada's 200 nautical mile (370 km) limit is officially recognized.

Full date unknown
The year sees a severe recession in the economy.
In a case concerning the development of the Hibernia Oil Field the Supreme Court rules that the continental shelf falls under federal jurisdiction.
Ed Mirvish purchases London's Old Vic theatre.
Colin Thatcher is elected to his third term in the Saskatchewan Legislative Assembly, where he is appointed Minister of Energy and Mines.

Arts and literature

New books
Dig up My Heart: Milton Acorn

Awards
See 1982 Governor General's Awards for a complete list of winners and finalists for those awards.
Books in Canada First Novel Award: Joy Kogawa, Obasan
Gerald Lampert Award: Abraham Boyarsky, Schielber and Edna Alford, A Sleep Full of Dreams
Pat Lowther Award: Rona Murray, Journey
Stephen Leacock Award: Mervyn J. Huston, Gophers Don't Pay Taxes Tree
Vicky Metcalf Award: Janet Lunn

Film
 'E' released

Dance
 Arnold Spohr wins the Dancemagazine Award

Sports
March 14 – The Moncton Aigles Bleus win their second (consecutive) University Cup be defeating the Saskatchewan Huskies 3 to 2. The final game was played in the Moncton Coliseum in Moncton, New Brunswick
May 9 – Gilles Villeneuve is killed at the Belgian Grand Prix.
May 15 – The Kitchener Rangers win their first Memorial Cup by defeating the Sherbrooke Castors 7 to 4. The final game was played at Robert Guertin Arena in Hull, Quebec
May 16 – The New York Islanders win their third (consecutive) Stanley Cup by defeating the Vancouver Canucks 4 games to 0. The deciding Game 4 was played at Pacific Coliseum in Vancouver. Montreal's Mike Bossy was awarded the Conn Smythe Trophy
November 20 – The UBC Thunderbirds win their first Vanier Cup by defeating the Western Ontario Mustangs by a score of 39–14 in the 18th Vanier Cup played at Varsity Stadium in Toronto
November 28 – The Edmonton Eskimos win their ninth (fifth consecutive) Grey Cup by defeating the Toronto Argonauts in the 70th Grey Cup played at Exhibition Stadium in Toronto

Births

January 5 – Tiiu Nurmberg, skier
January 12 – Shawn Desman, pop musician
January 31 – Jay Malinowski musician
March 10 – Kathleen Stoody, swimmer
March 18 – Matthew Lombardi, ice hockey player
March 30 – A-Trak, DJ and turntablist
April 3 – Cobie Smulders, actress and model
April 9 – Jay Baruchel, actor and comedian
April 14 – Lise Leveille, gymnast
April 15 – Seth Rogen, actor, comedian, and filmmaker 
April 16 – Aaron Feltham, water polo player
April 24 – Shayna Nackoney, synchronized swimmer
May 6 – Kyle Shewfelt, gymnast
May 10 – Adam Sioui, swimmer
May 11 – Cory Monteith, actor (d. 2013)
May 12 – Rhian Wilkinson, soccer player
May 16 – Melissa Altro, actress 
May 23 – Linda Consolante, soccer player
June 9 – Rachel Schill, softball player
June 16 – Kathy Tremblay, triathlete
June 23 – Derek Boogaard, hockey player (d. 2011)
June 24 – Jarret Stoll, ice hockey player
July – Gregory Despres, murder
July 6 – Kelly Stefanyshyn, swimmer
July 9 – Viola Yanik, wrestler
July 17 – Jessi Cruickshank, television host
August 21 – Omar Sachedina, journalist and news anchor
September 1 – Jeffrey Buttle, figure skater, Olympic bronze medallist and World Champion
September 2 – Kelly Haxton, soccer player
September 21 – Cindy Eadie, softball player
September 23 – Shyla Stylez, porn actress (d. 2017)
October 29 – Chelan Simmons, actress
October 31 – Justin Chatwin, actor
November 26 – Alison Braden, water polo player
November 29 – Elizabeth Collins, swimmer
December 22 – Brooke Nevin, actress
December 29 – Brian Hill, Paralympic swimmer
December 30 – Kristin Kreuk, actress

Full date unknown
Ryan Riordon, politician

Deaths

January to June
January 5 – Elizabeth Bagshaw, doctor (b.1881)
March 28 – William Giauque, chemist and Nobel laureate (b.1895)

May 8 – Gilles Villeneuve, motor racing driver (b.1950).
June 10 – Elizabeth Goudie, writer (b.1902).
June 28 – Igor Gouzenko, Russian defector (b.1919)

July to December
July 25 – Hal Foster, cartoonist (b.1892)
October 4 – Glenn Gould, pianist (b.1932)
October 16 – Hugh John Flemming, politician and 24th Premier of New Brunswick (b.1899)
October 16 – Hans Selye, endocrinologist (b.1907)
October 18 – John Robarts, lawyer, politician and 17th Premier of Ontario (b.1917)
November 2 – J. Dewey Soper, Arctic explorer, zoologist, ornithologist and author (b.1893)
November 19 – Erving Goffman, sociologist and writer (b.1922)
November 29 – Percy Williams, athlete and double Olympic gold medallist (b.1908)
December 7 – Harry Jerome, track and field runner (b.1940)
December 19 – George Isaac Smith, lawyer, politician and Premier of Nova Scotia (b.1909)

See also
 1982 in Canadian television
 List of Canadian films of 1982

References

 
Years of the 20th century in Canada
1982 in North America